José Alberto Sánchez Cairo (2 September 1986) is a Cuban athlete who competes mainly in the steeplechase, with his best results in the 3000 metres steeplechase. He last competed in 2018.

Personal bests
1500 metres: 3:45.13 min –  Huelva, 9 June 2010
3000 metres: 8:13.63 min – / Baie-Mahault, 1 May 2010
5000 metres: 14:10.77 min –  Havana, 25 April 2009
3000 metres steeplechase: 8:26.16 min NR –  Havana, 19 June 2009

Competition record

See also
List of Central American and Caribbean Championships records

References

External links

1986 births
Living people
People from Corralillo
Cuban male steeplechase runners
Pan American Games bronze medalists for Cuba
Pan American Games medalists in athletics (track and field)
Athletes (track and field) at the 2007 Pan American Games
Central American and Caribbean Games bronze medalists for Cuba
Competitors at the 2006 Central American and Caribbean Games
Central American and Caribbean Games medalists in athletics
Medalists at the 2007 Pan American Games